Tequila is the third full-length album by American hard rock band, Brand New Sin. This is the second album released on their current label, Century Media Records.

A music video was filmed for "Motormeth". Portions of the video were shot at the Dinosaur Bar-b-que restaurant in Syracuse, New York.

Peter Steele from Type O Negative provided guest vocals on the song "Reaper Man".

Track listing

 "Said and Done"
 "Did Me Wrong"
 "Spare the Agony"
 "Ice Man"
 "The Proposition"
 "Old"
 "Worm Whore"
 "See the Sun"
 "Motormeth"
 "Numero Dos"
 "Elogio"
 "Reaper Man"
 "Acehole"
 "House of the Rising Sun"

Personnel
Joe Altier – vocals
Kris Wiechmann – guitar
Kenny Dunham – guitar
Chuck Kahl – bass
Kevin Dean – drums
Joey Z – producer, Engineered and mixed
Mastered by George Marino at Sterling Sound.
Recorded at Method Of Groove Studio Brooklyn, New York.

Critical reaction
AllMusic rated it 4/5, praising the band's "attractive sound" and "consistently excellent material".  Ultimate Guitar rated it 8.3/10, singling out their cover of "House Of The Rising Sun" for particular praise.

References

External links
 www.brandnewsin.org
 www.centurymedia.com

2006 albums
Brand New Sin albums